The Tillman County Courthouse, at 201 N. Main St. in Frederick, Oklahoma, was built in 1921.  It was listed on the National Register of Historic Places in 1984.

It was a work of architects Tonini & Bramblet. It is a three-story concrete slab building with concrete slabs presented to resemble cut stone.

References

Courthouses in Texas
National Register of Historic Places in Tillman County, Oklahoma
Government buildings completed in 1921